Gülövşə (also, Külövşə and Gyulevsha) is a village and municipality in the Yevlakh Rayon of Azerbaijan. It has a population of 2,237.  The municipality consists of the villages of Gülövşə and Bəydili.

References 

Populated places in Yevlakh District